Linda Rae Chisholm (born December 21, 1957 in Northridge, California) is a former American competitive volleyball player and Olympic silver medalist.  She played NCAA women's volleyball for the Pepperdine Waves. She is 6ft 2in (188cm) tall.

References

 

American women's volleyball players
Volleyball players at the 1984 Summer Olympics
Olympic silver medalists for the United States in volleyball
1957 births
People from Northridge, Los Angeles
Living people
Pepperdine Waves women's volleyball players
Medalists at the 1984 Summer Olympics